Adolf-Hitler-Platz is the former name of many city squares in Nazi Germany, for example:
 Theodor-Heuss-Platz in Berlin
 Rathausplatz in Vienna
 Victory Square, Kaliningrad in Kaliningrad
Kowale Oleckie in Poland